Ivan Pavlovich Tretiakov (born 7 January 1989) is a Russian former competitive figure skater. He won silver medals at the 2009 Nebelhorn Trophy and 2010 NRW Trophy. He made his Grand Prix debut at the 2009 Cup of Russia. He was a member of the 2009–10 Russian reserve team.

Programs

Competitive highlights 
GP: Grand Prix; JGP: Junior Grand Prix

References

External links 

 

Russian male single skaters
1989 births
Living people
Sportspeople from Kirov, Kirov Oblast